Thomas P. Stossel (September 10, 1941 – September 29, 2019) was an American hematologist, inventor, medical researcher, and writer that discovered gelsolin, and invented the BioAegis technology estate. He was also a professor emeritus of medicine at Harvard Medical School and professor emeritus of clinical research at the American Cancer Society. He was Chief Scientific Advisor to BioAegis Therapeutics Inc., a clinical stage biotech company developing a unique non-immunosuppressive, anti-inflammatory with potential to address a wide range of infectious, inflammatory and degenerative diseases. He is the holder of more than 50 patents and had authored more than 300 papers, studies, and reviews. He was also a member of the National Academy of Sciences, the American Academy of Arts and Sciences, and the National Academy of Medicine, past editor-in-chief of Current Opinion in Hematology and past editor of the Journal of Clinical Investigation, past president of the American Society of Hematology and the American Society for Clinical Investigation.

Education and career
Stossel earned a BA degree summa cum laude from Princeton University and an MD degree cum laude from Harvard Medical School. He completed his internship and residency in internal medicine at the Massachusetts General Hospital in Boston and was a staff associate at the National Heart Institute after which he received training in hematology at Boston Children's and Peter Bent Brigham Hospitals. He was chief of hematology-oncology at the Massachusetts General Hospital (1976 to 1991), head of experimental medicine at Brigham and Women's Hospital (1991–1998), co-director of hematology (1998–2006) and translational medicine (2011–2014) at that institution. He served on the scientific advisory boards of Biogen, Inc. (1997–2002), Dyax, Inc. (1991–2001) and has been a director of Velico Medical Inc. since 2000. He was president of the American Society for Clinical Investigation and of the American Society of Hematology, served on the Lasker Awards' Jury and as editor-in-chief of The Journal of Clinical Investigation and of Current Opinion in Hematology. Until his death he was a member of the scientific advisory board of The Forsyth Dental Institute and a trustee of the American Council on Science and Health.

Scientific contributions
Stossel's research encompassed wide-ranging studies of white blood cell structure function in health and disease but predominantly focused on the molecular mechanism of how cells move and change shape. This research led to the discovery of two important cellular proteins, filamin and gelsolin, that regulate the assembly of actin. Gelsolin is also an abundant extracellular protein that circulates in blood plasma, and Stossel established that it is a component of innate immunity that promotes host antimicrobial activity and prevents the potentially lethal dissemination of inflammation. His company, BioAegis Therapeutics, is conducting clinical trials to assess the potential of plasma gelsolin therapy in a wide variety of infectious, inflammatory and degenerative diseases.

BioAegis Therapeutics

Tom Stossel was co-founder and chief scientific advisor to BioAegis, a clinical stage company focused on developing therapies for infectious, inflammatory and degenerative diseases through a portfolio built around plasma gelsolin technology and therapeutics. The company is commercializing recent scientific discoveries that harness the body's innate defense system to prevent serious outcomes. BioAegis' platform of opportunities exploits the multifunctional role of Plasma Gelsolin ("pGSN"), a highly conserved, endogenous human protein. pGSN is a master regulator—a key immune modulator that balances the inflammatory process to prevent the spread of excess inflammation while simultaneously enhancing antimicrobial defense. It is a unique anti-inflammatory without immunosuppressive properties. In August 2019, BioAegis successfully completed a Phase 1b/2a Community Acquired Pneumonia clinical trial. Based on abundant pre-clinical efficacy evidence and the outcome of the clinical trial, BioAegis is now raising funding to launch a phase 2b trial in severe pneumonia designed to demonstrate definitively that plasma gelsolin repletion reduces morbidity and mortality.

Publications
Stossel was the author of almost 300 publications, including co-authoring two textbooks, Haematology: A Pathophysiological Approach (1984) and Blood: Principles and Practice of Hematology (1997) and the consumer book Pharmaphobia: How the Conflict of Interest Myth Undermines American Medical Innovation (2015).

Policy work
Stossel wrote extensively on policy issues related to medical research and on the relationships between academic researchers, physicians, and the medical products industry. His articles and op-eds have appeared in many publications including The Wall Street Journal, The Washington Post and The Boston Globe. His book, Pharmaphobia, How the Conflict of Interest Myth Undermines American Medical Innovation, was published by Rowman and Littlefield in 2015. He was a senior fellow of The Manhattan Institute (2008–2009) and a visiting scholar of the American Enterprise Institute (2014–2017). Stossel has been supportive of industry ethics since 1987, when he joined the scientific advisory board of Biogen. He was also critical of the Affordable Care Act rule known as the Physician Payments Sunshine Act, requiring all companies that sell medical products to the government to disclose on a public website anything they give to physicians that is valued above $10.

Awards
Kennedy and Class of 1868 Prizes (Princeton University) 1963
Resnick Award (Harvard Medical School) 1967
Dameshek Award (American Society of Hematology 1983
American Cancer Society Research Professorship 1987
Honorary MD (Linkökping University, Sweden) 1989
E Donnall Thomas Prize (American Society of Hematology) 1993
Elected, American Academy of Arts and Sciences (1996)
Elected, National Academy of Sciences (1997)
Elected, National Academy of Medicine (1998)
Lewis M Sherwood Award (Academy of Pharmaceutical Physicians) 2009
McGovern Medal (American Medical Writers Association) 2010
Humanitarian Award (Brigham & Women's Hospital) 2012

Charity work
Stossel was a co-founder of Options for Children in Zambia, which provides dental and medical preventive care and other services to the country's major teaching hospital, an orphanage, and remote rural villages. He also established Lusaka Zambia, a sickle cell disease clinical and research center in collaboration with physicians at the University Teaching Hospital, University of Zambia, Lusaka, Zambia.

Personal life
Stossel had three children: Scott Stossel, national editor of The Atlantic, Sage Stossel, cartoonist and author of On the Loose in Boston, Washington DC, Philadelphia and New York, and Tamara Sakala-Stossel, a graduate student at Northeastern University. With his wife, Kerry Maguire DDS, MSPH (a public health dentist who is vice president for clinical operations of the Forsyth Dental Institute, Cambridge, MA) and others, Stossel co-founded a 501(c)(3) charity, Options for Children in Zambia, that provides voluntary dental and medical care in the country. Stossel's younger brother, John Stossel, is a prominent television personality who espouses libertarian ideas. John characterized Tom as "the superstar of the family" and commented, "While I partied and played poker, he studied hard, got top grades, and went to Harvard Medical School."

Research

1. Stossel TP, Jennings RB. Failure of methylene blue to produce methemoglobinemia in vivo. Am J Clin Pathol. 1966; 45:500-506.

2. Stossel TP. Alterations in hematocrit and respiratory rate induced by methylene blue. Proc Soc Exp Biol Med. 1968; 128:93-95.

3. Stossel TP. Effect of methylene blue on blood pH oxygen and CO2. Proc Soc Exp Biol Med. 1968; 128:96-97.

4. Nathan DG, Stossel TP, Gunn RB, Zarkowsky HS, Laforet MT. Influence of hemoglobin precipitation on erythrocyte metabolism in alpha and beta thalassemia. J Clin Invest. 1969; 48:33-41.

5. Stossel TP, Levy R. Intravascular coagulation associated with pneumococcal bacteremia and symmetrical peripheral gangrene. Arch Intern Med. 1970; 125:876-878.

6. Stossel TP, Murad F, Mason RJ, Vaughan M. Regulation of glycogen metabolism in polymorphonuclear leukocytes. J Biol Chem. 1970; 245:6228-6235.

7. Stossel TP, Pollard TD, Mason RJ, Vaughan, M. Isolation and properties of phagocytic vesicles from polymorphonuclear leukocytes. J Clin Invest. 1971; 50:1745-1758.

8. Stossel TP, Mason RJ, Pollard TD, Vaughan M. Isolation and properties of phagocytic vesicles II. Alveolar macrophages. J Clin Invest. 1972; 51:604-614.

9. Stossel TP, Mason RJ, Hartwig JH, Vaughan M. Quantitative studies of phagocytosis by polymorphonuclear leukocytes. Use of emulsions to measure the initial rate of phagocytosis. J Clin Invest. 1972; 51:615-624.

10. Stossel TP, Root RK, Vaugan M. Phagocytosis in chronic granulomatous disease and the Chediak-Higashi syndrome. N Engl J Med. 1972; 286:120-123.

11. Manganiello V, Evans WH, Stossel TP, Mason RJ, Vaughan M. The effect of polystyrene beads on cyclic AMP concentration in human leukocytes. J Clin Invest. 1971; 50:2741-2744.

12. Elsbach P, Patriarca P, Pettis P, Stossel TP, Mason RJ, Vaughan M. Incorporation of 32p-lysolecithin into phagosomal membranes of polymorphonuclear leukocytes. J Clin Invest. 1972; 51:1910-1914.

13. Mason RJ, Stossel TP, Vaughan M. Lipids of polymorphonuclear leukocytes, alveolar macrophages and their phagocytic vesicles. J Clin Invest. 1972; 51:2399-2407.

14. Mason RJ, Stossel TP, Vaughan M. Quantitative studies of phagocytosis in alveolar macrophages. Biochimica et Biophysica Acta. 1973; 304:864-870.

15. Stossel TP, Alper CA, Rosen FS. Serum-dependent phagocytosis of paraffin oil emulsified with bacterial lipopolysaccharide. J Exp Med. 1973; 137:690-705.

16. Stossel TP. Evaluation of opsonic and leukocyte function with a spectrophotometric test in patients with infection and with phagocytic disorders. Blood. 1973; 42:121-130.

17. Stossel TP. Quantitative studies of phagocytosis. Kinetic effects of cations and heat-labile opsonin. J Cell Biol. 1973; 58:346-356.

18. Stossel TP, Alper CA, Rosen FS. Opsonic activity in the newborn. Role of properdin. Pediatrics. 1973; 52:173-176.

19. Stossel TP, Pollard TD. Myosin in polymorphonuclear leukocytes. J Biol Chem. 1973; 248:8288-8294.

20. Root RK, Stossel TP. Myeloperoxidase-mediated iodination by granulocytes: Intracellular site of operation and some regulating factors. J Clin Invest. 1974; 53:1207-1215.

21. Boxer LA, Stossel TP. Effects of anti-human neutrophil antibodies in vitro. Quantitative studies. J Clin Invest. 1974; 53:1543-1545.

22. Altman A, Stossel TP. Functional immaturity of bone marrow granulocytes. Brit J Haemat. 1974; 27:241-245.

23. Handin RI, Stossel TP. Phagocytosis of antibody-coated platelets by human granulocytes. N. Engl J. Med. 1974; 290:989-933.

24. Stossel TP, Mason RJ, Smith AL. Lipid peroxidation by human blood phagocytes. J Clin Invest. 1974; 54:638-645.

25. Boxer LA, Hedley-Whyte ET, Stossel TP. Neutrophil actin dysfunction and abnormal neutrophil behavior. N Engl J Med. 1974; 291:1093-1099.

26. Smith AL, Rosenberg I, Averill DR, Moxon ER, Stossel TP, Smith DH. Brain polymorphonuclear leukocyte quantitation by peroxidase assay. Infection and Immunity. 1974; 10:356-360.

27. Stossel TP, Field RJ, Gitlin JA, Alper CA, Rosen FS. The opsonic fragment of third component of human complement (C3). J Exp Med. 1975; 141:1329-1347.

28. Hartwig JH, Stossel TP. Isolation and properties of actin, myosin and a new actin- binding protein in rabbit alveolar macrophages. J Biol Chem. 1975; 250:5696-5705.

29. Stossel TP, Hartwig JH. Interactions between actin, myosin and an actin-binding protein from rabbit alveolar macrophages. Alveolar macrophage myosin Mg2+- adenosine triphosphatase requires a cofactor for activation by actin. J Biol Chem. 1975; 250:5706-5712.
 
30. Boxer LA, Greenberg MS, Boxer GJ, Stossel TP. Autoimmune neutropenia. N Engl J Med. 1975; 293:748-793.

31. Stossel TP, Hartwig JH. Interactions of actin, myosin and a new actin-binding protein of rabbit pulmonary macrophages II. Role in cytoplasmic movement and phagocytosis. J Cell Biol. 1976; 68:602-619.

32. Boxer LA, Stossel TP. Interactions of actin, myosin and an actin-binding protein of chronic myelogenous leukemia leukocytes. J Clin Invest. 1976; 57:964-976.

33. Pincus SH, Boxer LA, Stossel TP. Chronic neutropenia in childhood. Analysis of 16 cases and review of the literature. Am J Med. 1976; 61:849-861.

34. Hartwig JH, Stossel TP. Interactions of actin, myosin and an actin-binding protein of rabbit pulmonary macrophages III. Effects of cytochalasin B. J Cell Biol. 1976; 71:295-303.

35. Camitta BM, Quesenberry PJ, Parkman R, Boxer LA, Stossel TP, Cassidy JR, Rappeport JM, Nathan DG. Bone marrow transplantation for a syndrome of neutrophil dysfunction. Exp Hemat. 1977; 5:109-116.

36. Klock JC, Stossel TP. Detection, pathogenesis and prevention of damage to human granulocytes caused by interaction with nylon wool fiber: implication for filtration leukapheresis. J Clin Invest. 1977; 60:1183-1190.

37. Davies WA, Stossel TP. Peripheral hyaline blebs (podosomes) of macrophages. J Cell Biol. 1977; 75:941-955.

38. Hartwig JH, Davies WA, Stossel TP. Evidence for contractile protein translocation in macrophage spreading, secretion and phagolysome formation. J Cell Biol. 1977; 75:956-967.

39. Shurin SB, Stossel TP. Complement (C3)-activation phagocytosis by lung macrophages. J Immunol. 1978; 120:1305-1312.

40. Handin RI, Stossel TP. Effect of corticosteroid therapy on the phagocytosis of antibody-coated platelets by human leukocytes. Blood. 1978; 51:771-779.

41. Weitzman SA, Stossel TP. Drug-induced immunologic neutropenia. Lancet. 1978; 1:1068-1072.

42. Brotschi EA, Hartwig JH, Stossel TP. The gelation of actin by actin-binding protein. J Biol Chem. 1978; 253:8988-8993.

43. Rinaldo CA, Jr., Hirsch MS, Stossel TP. Polymorphonuclear leukocyte function during cytomegalovirus mononucleosis. Clin Immunol Immunopath. 1979; 12:331-334.

44. Weitzman SA, Desmond MC, Stossel TP. Antigenic modulation and turnover in human neutrophils. J Clin Invest. 1979; 64:321-325.

45. Hartwig JH, Stossel TP. Cytochalasin B and the structure of actin gels. J Mol Biol. 1979; 134:539-554.

46. Yin HL, Stossel TP. Control of cytoplasmic actin gel-sol transformation by gelsolin, a calcium dependent regulatory protein. Nature. 1979; 281:583-586.

47. Klock JC, Boyles J, Bainton DF, Stossel TP. Nylon fiber-induced neutrophil fragmentation. Blood. 1979; 54:1216-1229.

48. Shurin SB, Sweeney E, Socransky SS, Stossel TP. A neutrophil disorder induced by Capnocytophaga, a dental microorganism. N Engl J Med. 1979; 301:849-854.

49. Arnaout MA, Stossel TP, Rosen FS, Alper CA. Solubilization of C3 fragments deposited on crosslinked dextran gel beads. Clin Immunol Immunopathol. 1979; 14:384-394.

50. Stendahl OI, Hartwig JH, Brotschi EA, Stossel TP. Distribution of actin-binding protein and myosin in macrophages during spreading and phagocytosis. J Cell Biol. 1980; 84:215-224.

51. Stendahl OI, Stossel TP. Actin-binding protein amplifies actomyosin contraction, and gelsolin confers calcium controls in the direction of contraction. Biochem Biophys Res Commun. 1980; 92:675-681.

52. Harmon DC, Weitzman SA, Stossel TP. A staphylococcal slide test for detection of antineutrophil antibodies. Blood. 1980; 56:64-69.

53. Lew PD, Stossel TP. Calcium transport by macrophage plasma membranes. J Biol Chem. 1980; 255:5841-5846.

54. Amrein PC, Stossel TP. Prevention of degradation of human polymorphonuclear leukocyte proteins by diisopropylfluorophosphate. Blood. 1980; 56:442-447.

55. Crowley CA, Curnutte JI, Rosin RE, Andre'-Swartz J, Gallin JI, Klempner M, Snyderman R, Southwick FS, Stossel TP, Babior BM. An inherited abnormality of neutrophil adhesion. Its genetic transmission and its association with a missing protein. N Engl J Med. 1980; 302:1163-1168.

56. Yin HL, Stossel TP. Purification and structural properties of gelsolin, a Ca2+- activated regulatory protein of macrophages. J Biol Chem. 1980; 255:9490-9493.

57. Yin HL, Zaner KS, Stossel TP. Ca2+ control of actin gelation. Interaction of gelsolin with actin filaments and regulation of gelation. J Biol Chem. 1980; 255:9494-9500.

58. Hartwig JH, Tyler J, Stossel TP. Actin-binding protein promotes the bipolar and branching polymerization of actin. J Cell Biol. 1980; 87:841-848.

59. Maruyama K, Hartwig JH, Stossel TP. Cytochalasin B and the structure of actin gels II. Further evidence for "splitting" of actin filaments by cytochalasin B. Biochem Biophys Acta. 1980; 626:494-500.

60. Lew PD, Stossel TP. The effect of calcium on superoxide production by phagocytic vesicles from rabbit alveolar macrophages. J Clin Invest. 1981; 67:1-9.
 
61. Hartwig JH, Stossel TP. The structure of actin-binding protein molecules in solution and interacting with actin filaments. J Mol Biol. 1981; 145:563-581.

62. Zaner KS, Fotland R, Stossel TP. A low-shear small volume viscoelastometer. Rev Sci Instruments. 1981; 52:85-87.

63. Southwick FS, Stossel, TP. Isolation of an inhibitor of actin polymerization from human polymorphonuclear leukocytes. J Biol Chem. 1981; 256:3030-3036.

64. Valerius NH, Hartwig JH, Stendahl OI, Stossel TP. Distribution of actin-binding protein and myosin in polymorphonuclear leukocytes during locomotion and phagocytosis. Cell. 1981; 24:195-202.

65. Weitzman SA, Stossel TP. Mutagenicity caused by human phagocytes. Science. 1981; 212:546-547.

66. Davies WA, Stossel TP. External membrane proteins of rabbit lung macrophages. Arch Biochem Biophys. 1981; 206:190-197.

67. Yin HL, Hartwig JH, Maruyama K, Stossel TP. Ca2+ control of actin filament length. Effects of macrophage gelsolin on actin polymerization. J Biol. Chem. 1981; 256:9693-9697.

68. Lew PD, Southwick FS, Stossel TP, Whitin JC, Simons E, Cohen HJ. A variant of chronic granulomatous disease: deficient oxidative metabolism due to a low-affinity NADPH oxidase. N Engl J Med. 1981; 305:1329-1333.

69.Weitzman SA, Stossel TP. Effects of oxygen radical scavengers and antioxidants on phagocyte-induced mutagenesis in bacteria. J. Immunol. 1982; 128:2770-2772.

70. Zaner KS, Stossel TP. Some perspectives on the viscosity of actin filaments. J Cell Biol. 1982; 93:987-991.

72. Lind SE, Yin HL, Stossel TP. Human platelets contain gelsolin, a regulator of actin filament length. J Clin Invest. 1982; 69:1384-1387.

73. Kruskall MS, Weitzman SA, Stossel TP, Harris N, Robinson SH. Lymphoma with autoimmune neutropenia and hepatic sinusoidal infiltration: a syndrome. Ann Int Med. 1982; 97:202-205.

74. Southwick FS, Tatsumi N, Stossel TP. Acumentin, an actin modulating protein of rabbit pulmonary macrophages. Biochemistry. 1982; 21:6321-6326.

75. Thorstensson R, Utter G, Norberg R, Fagraeus A, Hartwig JH, Yin HL, Stossel TP. Distribution of actin, myosin, actin-binding protein and gelsolin in cultured lymphoid cells. Exp Cell Res. 1982; 140:395-400.

76. Weitberg AB, Weitzman SA, Destrempes M, Latt SA, Stossel TP. Stimulated human phagocytes produce cytogenetic changes in cultured mammalian cells. N Engl J Med. 1983; 308:26-30.
 
77. Fattoum A, Hartwig JH, Stossel TP. Isolation and some structural and functional properties of macrophage tropomyosin. Biochemistry. 1983; 22:1187-1193.

78. Harmon DC, Weitzman SA, Stossel TP. A slide test for detecting neutrophil- associated complement components. Transfusion. 1983; 23:131-134.

79. Zaner KS, Stossel TP. Physical basis of the rheologic properties of F-actin. J. Biol. Chem. 1983; 258:11004-11009.

80. Bennett JP, Zaner KS, Stossel TP. Isolation and some properties of macrophage alpha actinin: evidence that it is not an actin gelling protein. Biochemistry, 1984; 123:5081-5086.

81. Brady ST, Lasek RJ, Allen RD, Yin HL, Stossel TP. Gelsolin inhibition of fast axonal transport indicates a requirement for actin microfilaments. Nature, 1984; 310:56-58.

82. Weitzman SA, Stossel TP, Harmon DC, Daniels G, Maloof F, Ridgeway EC. Antineutrophil autoantibodies in Graves' Disease. Implications of thyrotropin binding to neutrophils. J Clin Invest. 1985; 75:119-123.

83. Weitberg AB, Weitzman SA, Clark EP, Stossel TP. Effects of antioxidants on oxidant-induced sister chromatid exchange formation. J Clin Invest. 1985; 75:1835-1841.

84. Janmey PA, Chaponnier C, Lind SE, Zaner KS, Stossel TP, Yin HL. Interactions of gelsolin and gelsolin: actin complexes with actin. Effects of calcium on actin nucleation, severing and end blocking. Biochemistry. 1985; 24:3714-3723.

85. Weitzman SA, Weitberg AB, Clark EP, Stossel TP. Phagocytes as carcinogens. Science. 1985; 227:1231-1233.

86. Weitzman SA, Weitberg AB, Niederman R, Stossel TP. Chronic treatment with hydrogen peroxide. Is it safe? J Periodontol 1984; 55:510-511.

87. Weitzman SA, Stossel TP. Phagocyte induced mutation in Chinese hamster ovary cells. Cancer Lett. 1984; 22:337-341.

88. Harmon DC, Weitzman SA, Stossel TP. The severity of immune neutropenia correlates with the maturational specificity of antineutrophil antibodies. Brit J Haemat. 1984; 58:209-215.

89. Janmey PA, Lind SE, Yin HL, Stossel TP. Effects of semi-dilute actin solutions on the mobility of fibrin protofibrils during clot formation. Biochim Biophys Acta. 1985; 841:151-158.

90. Janmey PA, Chaponnier C, Lind SE, Zaner KS, Stossel TP, Yin HL. Interactions of gelsolin: actin complexes with actin. Effects of calcium on actin nucleation, filament severing and end blocking. Biochemistry. 1985; 24:3714-3723.

91. Janmey PA, Peetermans J, Zaner KS, Stossel TP, Tanaka T. Structure and mobility of actin filaments as measured by quasielastic light scattering, viscometry, and electron microscopy. J Biol Chem. 1986; 261:8357-8362.

92. Janmey PA, Stossel TP, Lind SE. Sequential binding of actin monomers to plasma gelsolin and its inhibition by vitamin D-binding protein. Biochem Biophys Res Commun, 1986; 136:72-79.

93. Janmey PA, Stossel TP. Kinetics of actin monomer exchange at the slow growing ends of actin filaments and their relation to the elongation of filaments shortened by gelsolin. J Muscle Res Cell Motility. 1986; 7:446-454.

94. Lind SE, Smith DB, Janmey PA, Stossel TP. The role of plasma gelsolin and the vitamin D-binding protein in clearing actin from the circulation. J Clin Invest. 1986; 78:736-742.

95. Kwiatkowski DJ, Stossel TP, Orkin SH, Mole JE, Colten HR, Yin HL. Plasma and cytoplasmic gelsolins are encoded by a single gene and contain a duplicated actin- binding domain. Nature. 1986; 323:455 458.

96. Chaponnier C, Yin HL, Stossel TP. Reversibility of gelsolin-actin interaction in macrophages: Evidence for Ca2+-independent pathways. J Exp Med.1987; 165:97-106.

97. Janmey PA, Stossel TP. Modulation of gelsolin function by phosphatidylinositol-4, 5- bisphosphate. Nature. 1987; 325:362-364.

98. Ito T, Zaner KS, Stossel TP. Nonideality and phase transitions of F-actin solutions in response to osmotic stress. Biophys J, 1987; 51:745-753.

99. Lind SE, Janmey PA, Chaponnier C, Herbert TJ, Stossel TP. Reversible binding of actin to gelsolin and profilin in human platelets. J Cell Biol. 1987; 105:833-842.

100. Janmey PA, Iida K, Yin HL, Stossel TP. Polyphosphoinositide micelles and polyphosphoinositide-containing vesicles dissociate endogenous gelsolin-actin complexes and promote actin assembly from the fast-growing end of actin filaments blocked by gelsolin. J Biol Chem. 1987; 262:12228-12236.

101. Lind SE, Smith DB, Janmey PA, Stossel TP. Depression of gelsolin levels and detection of gelsolin-actin complexes in plasma of patients with acute lung injury. Am Rev Resp Dis. 1988; 138:429-434.

102. Ezzell RM, Kenney DM, Egan S, Stossel TP, Hartwig JH. Localization of the domain actin-binding protein that binds to glycoprotein Ib and actin in human platelets. J Biol Chem. 1988; 263:1303-1309.

103. Janmey PA, Hvidt S, Peetermans J, Lamb J, Ferry JD, Stossel TP. Viscoelasticity of F-actin and F-actin/gelsolin complexes. Biochemistry. 1988; 27:8218-8227.

104. Southwick FS, Dabiri GA, Stossel TP. Neutrophil actin dysfunction is a genetic disorder associated with partial impairment of neutrophil actin assembly in three family members. J Clin Invest. 1988; 82:1525-1531.

105. Hartwig JH, Chambers K, Stossel TP. Association of gelsolin with actin filaments and with cell membranes of macrophages and platelets. J Cell Biol. 1989; 108:467-479.
 
106. Janmey PA, Stossel TP. Gelsolin-polyphosphoinositide interaction. Full expression of gelsolin-inhibiting function by polyphosphoinositides in vesicular form and inactivation by dilution, aggregation, or masking of the inositol head group. J Biol Chem. 1989; 264:4825-4831.

107. Southwick FS, Howard TH, Holbrook T, Anderson DC, Stossel TP, Arnaout MA. The relationship between CR3 deficiency and neutrophil actin assembly. Blood. 1989; 73:1973-1979.

108. Howard T, Chaponnier C, Yin H, Stossel TP. Gelsolin-actin interaction and actin polymerization in human neutrophils. J Cell Biol. 1990:110;1983-1991.

109. Janmey PA, Hvidt S, Lamb J, Stossel TP. Resemblance of actin-binding protein actin gels to covalently crosslinked networks. Nature. 1990:345:89-92.

110. Gorlin J, Yamin R, Egan S, Stewart M, Stossel TP, Kwiatkowski DJ, Hartwig JH. Human endothelial actin-binding protein (ABP, nonmuscle filamin): a molecular leaf spring. J Cell Biol. 1990; 111:1089-1105.

111. Janmey PA, Hvidt S, Oster GF, Lamb J, Stossel TP, Hartwig JH. Effect of ATP on actin filament stiffness. Nature. 1990; 347:95-99.

112. Cunningham CC, Stossel TP, Kwiatkowski DJ. Enhanced motility in NIH 3T3 fibroblasts that overexpress gelsolin. Science. 1991; 251: 1233–1236.

113. Ohta, Y, Stossel, TP, Hartwig JH. Ligand-sensitive binding of the high-affinity IgG receptor (FcgR1) to actin-binding protein. Cell. 1991; 67:275-282.

114. Cunningham, CC, Gorlin, JB, Kwiatkowski, DJ, Hartwig, JH, Janmey, PA, Byers, R, Stossel, TP. Actin-binding protein requirement for cortical stability and efficient locomotion. Science. 1992; 255: 325–327.

115. Ito, T, Suzuki, A, Stossel, TP. Regulation of water flow by actin-binding protein- induced actin gelation. Biophys J. 1992; 61: 1301–1305.

116. Katakami, Y, Katakami, N, Janmey, P, Hartwig J, Stossel, TP. Isolation of the phosphatidylinositol 4-monophosphate-dissociable high-affinity profilin-actin complex. Biochim Biophys Acta. 1992; 1122: 123–135.

117. Stossel, TP. On the crawling of animal cells. Science. 1993; 260: 1086–1094.

118. Vasconcellos, CA, Allen, PG, Wohl, ME, Drazen, JM, Janmey, PA, Stossel, TP. Reduction in viscosity of cystic fibrosis sputum in vitro by gelsolin. Science. 1994; 263: 969–971.

119. Janmey, PA, Hvidt, S, Käs, J, Lerche, D, Maggs, A, Sackmann, E, Schliwa, M, Stossel, TP. Mechanical properties of actin gels. Elastic modulus and filament motions. J Biol Chem, 1994, 269: 32503–32513.

120. Fujita, H, Laham, LE, Janmey, PA, Kwiatkowski, DJ, Stossel, TP, Banno, Y, Yoshinori, N, Müllauer, L, Akira, I, Kuzumaki, N. Functions of mutant gelsolin His 321 isolated from a flat revertant of Ras-transformed cells. Eur J Biochem, 1995; 229: 615-620.

121. Witke, W, Sharpe, AH, Hartwig, JH, Azuma, T, Stossel, TP, Kwiatkowski, DJ. Hemostatic, inflammatory, and fibroblastic responses are blunted in mice lacking gelsolin. Cell, 1995; 81: 41–51.

122. Hartwig, JH, Bokoch, G, Carptenter, C, Taylor, L, Toker, A, Stossel, TP. Thrombin receptor ligation and activated rac uncap actin filament barbed ends through phosphoinositide synthesis in permeabilized platelets. Cell, 1995, 82: 643-653

123. Sheils, CA, Käs, J, Travassos, W, Allen, PG, Janmey, PA, Wohl, ME, Stossel, TP. Actin filaments mediate DNA fiber formation in chronic inflammatory airway disease. Am J Path. 1996; 148: 919–927.

124. Hartwig, JH, Kung, S, Kovacsovics, T, Janmey, P, Cantley, LC, Stossel, TP, Toker, A. D3 phosphoinositides and outside-in integrin signaling by GPIIb/IIIa mediate platelet actin assembly and filopodial extension induced by phorbol 12-myristate 13-acetate. J Biol Chem. 1996; 271: 32986–32993.

125. Marti, A, Luo, Z, Cunningham, C, Ohta, Y, Hartwig, J, Stossel, TP, Kyriakis, JM, Avruch, J. ABP-280 binds the SAPK activator SEK-1 and is required for the TNFa activation of SAPK in melanoma cells. J Biol Chem. 1997; 272: 2620–2628.

126. Fujita, H, Allen, PG, Janmey, PA, Azuma, T, Kwiatkowski, DJ, Stossel, TP, Furu- Uchi, K, Kuzumaki, N. Characterization of gelsolin truncates that inhibit actin depolymerization by severing activity of gelsolin and cofilin. Eur J Biochem. 1997; 248: 834–839.

127. Azuma, T, Witke, W, Stossel, TP, Hartwig, JH, Kwiatkowski, DJ. Gelsolin is a downstream effector of rac for fibroblast motility. EMBO J, 1998, 17: 1362–1370.

128. Xu, J, Schwartz, WH, Käs, JA, Stossel, TP, Janmey, PA, Pollard, TD. Mechanical properties of actin filament networks depend on preparation, polymerization conditions and storage of actin monomers. Biophys J, 1998, 74; 2731–2740.

129. Ohta, Y, Suzuki, N, Nakamura, S, Hartwig, JH, Stossel, TP. The small GTPase RalA targets filamin to induce filopodia. Proc Nat Acad Sci USA 1999; 96: 2122–2128.

130. Tang, J, Ito, T, Stossel, TP, Janmey, PA. Thiol oxidation of actin produces dimers that enhance the elasticity of F-actin network. Biophys J, 1999; 76: 2208–2215.

131. Goetzl, EJ, Lee, H, Azuma, T, Stossel, TP, Turck, CW, Karliner, JS. Gelsolin binding and cellular presentation of lysophosphatidic acid. J Biol Chem. 2000; 275: 14573–14578.

132. Fenteany, G, Janmey, PA, Stossel, TP. Signaling pathways and cell mechanics involved in wound closure by epithelial cell sheets. Curr Biol 2000; 10:831-838.

133. Glogauer, M, Hartwig, JH, Stossel, TP. Two pathways through Cdc42 couple the N- formyl receptor to actin nucleation in permeabilized human neutrophils J Cell Biol 2000; 150: 785–796.

114. Bellanger, JM, Astier, C, Sardet, C, Ohta, Y, Stossel, TP, Debant, A. The Rac1- and RhoG-activating domain of the bifunctional guanine nucleotide exchange factor Trio targets filamin to remodel cytoskeletal actin. Nature Cell Biol. 2000. 2: 888–892.

115. Stossel, TP, Condeelis, J, Cooley, L, Hartwig, JH, Noegel, AA, Schleicher, M, Shapiro, SS. Filamins as integrators of cell mechanics and signaling. Nature Rev Mol Cell Biol, 2001; 2: 138–145.

116. Hoffmeister, K, Falet, H, Toker, A, Barkalow, KL, Stossel, TP, Hartwig, JH. Mechanisms of cold-induced platelet actin assembly. J Biol Chem 2001; 276: 24751-24759.

117. Hussain, NK, Jenna, S, Glogauer, M, Quinn, CC, Wasiak, S, Kay, BK, Stossel, TP, Lamarche-Vane, N, McPherson, PS. The endocytic scaffolding protein intersectin-1 regulates actin dynamics via Cdc42 and N-WASP. Nature Cell Biol 2001; 3: 927–932.

118. Cunningham, CC, Vegners, R, Bucki, R, Funaki, M, Korde, N, Hartwig, JH, Stossel, TP, Janmey, PA. Cell permeant phosphoinositide-binding peptides that block cell motility and actin assembly. J Biol Chem 2001; 276, 43390–43399.

119. Flanagan, LA, Chou, J, Falet, H, Neujahr, R, Hartwig, JH, Stossel, TP. Filamin A, the Arp2/3 complex, and the morphology and function of cortical actin filaments in human melanoma cells. J Cell Biol 2001; 155: 511–517.

120. Christofidou-Solomidou, M, Scherpereel, A, Solomides, CC, Christie, JD, Stossel, TP, Goelz, S, DiNubile, M. Recombinant plasma gelsolin diminishes the acute inflammatory response to hyperoxia in mice. J Investig Med 2002; 50: 54–60.

121. Nakamura, F, Osborn, E, Janmey, PA, Stossel, TP. Comparison of filamin A- induced crosslinking and Arp2/3 complex-mediated branching on the mechanics of actin filaments. J Biol Chem. 2002; 277, 9148–9154.

122. Vadlamudi,RK, Li, F, Adam,L, Nguyen, D, Ohta Y., Stossel, TP, Kumar, R. 2002; Filamin is essential in actin cytoskeletal assembly mediated by p21-activated kinase 1. Nature Cell Biol, 4: 681–690.

123. DiNubile, MJ, Stossel TP, Ljunghusen, OC, Ferrara, JF, Antin, JH. 2002; Prognostic implications of declining plasma gelsolin levels after allogeneic stem cell transplantation. Blood 100: 4367–4371.

124. Falet, H, Hoffmeister, KM, Neujahr, R, Italiano, JE, Jr, Stossel, TP, Southwick, FS, Hartwig, JH. 2002; Importance of free actin filament barbed ends for Arp2/3 complex function in platelets and fibroblasts. Proc Nat Acad Sci USA, 99: 16782–16787.

125. Hoffmeister, KM, Felbinger, TW, Falet, H, Denis, CV, Bergmeier, W Mayadas, TN, von Andrian, UH, Wagner, D, Stossel, TP, Hartwig, JH. The clearance mechanism of chilled blood platelets. 2003. Cell, 112: 87–97.

126. Hoffmeister, KM, Josefsson, EC, Isaac, NA, Clausen, H, Hartwig, JH, Stossel, TP. Glycosylation restores survival of chilled blood platelets. 2003. Science 301: 1532–1534.

127. Woo, MS, Ohta, Y, Rabinovitz, I, Stossel, TP, Blenis, J. Ribosomal S6 kinase (RSK) phosphorylation of filamin A on an important regulatory site. 2004. Mol Cell Biol, 24: 3025–3035, 2004.

128. Valeri, CR, Ragno, G, Marks, PW, Kuter, DJ, Rosenberg, RD, Stossel, TP. Effect of thrombopoietin alone and a combination of cytochalasin B and ethylene glycol bis(ß- aminoethyl ether) N,N'-tetraacetic acid-AM on the survival and function of autologous baboon platelets stored at 40C for as long as 5 days. 2004. Transfusion, 44: 865–870.

129. Josefsson, EC, Gebhardt, HH, Stossel, TP, Hartwig, JH, Hoffmeister, KM. The macrophage aMß2 integrin aM-lectin domain mediates the phagocytosis of chilled platelets. 2005. J Biol Chem 280; 18025–18032.

130. Nakamura, F, Hartwig, JH, Stossel, TP, Syzmanski, PT. Ca2+ and calmodulin regulates binding of filamin A to actin filaments. 2005. J Biol Chem, 280: 32426–32433.

131. DiNardo, A, Cicchetti, G, Falet, H, Hartwig, JH, Stossel, TP, Kwiatkowski, DJ. Arp2/3 Complex-Deficient Mouse Fibroblasts are Viable and Have Normal Leading Edge Actin Structure and Function. 2005. Proc Nat Acad Sci USA, 102: 16263–16268.

132. Gardel, ML, Nakamura, F, Hartwig, JH, Crocker, J, Stossel, TP, Weitz, DA. Pre- stressed F-actin networks cross-linked by hinged filamins replicate mechanical properties of cells. 2006. Proc Nat Acad Sci USA, 103: 1762–1767.

133. Nakamura, F, Pudas, R, Heikkinen, O, Permi, P, Kilpeläinen, I, Munday, AD, Hartwig, JH, Stossel, TP, Ylänne, J. The structure of the Gp1b-filamin A complex. 2006. Blood, 107: 1925–1932.

134. Lee, P-S, Drager, LR, Stossel, TP, Moore, FD, Rogers, SO. Relationship of plasma gelsolin levels to outcomes in critically ill surgical patients. 2006. Ann Surg, 243: 399-403.

135. Gardel, ML, Nakamura, F, Hartwig, J, Crocker, JC, Weitz, DA. Stress-dependent elasticity of composite actin networks as a model for cell behavior. 2006. Phys Rev Lett, 96: 88102-1-881020-4.

136. Ohta Y, Hartwig, JH, Stossel, TP. FilGAP, a Rho and ROCK-Regulated GTPase Activating Protein for Rac Binds Filamin A to Control Actin Remodeling. 2006. Nat Cell Biol, 8: 803–814.

137. Babic, AM, Josefsson, EC, Bergmeier, W, Wagner, DD, Kaufman, RM, Silberstein, LE, Stossel, TP, Hartwig, JH, Hoffmeister, KM. In vitro function and phagocytosis of galactosylated platelet concentrates following long-term refrigeration. 2006. Transfusion, 47: 442–451.

138. Lee, P-S, Waxman, AB, Cotich, KL, Chung, SW, Bajwa, E, Christiani, DC, Perrella, MA, Stossel, TP. Plasma gelsolin is a marker and potential therapeutic agent in sepsis. 2006. Crit Care Med, 35: 849–855.

139. Osborne, T, Dahlgren, C, Hartwig, JH, Stossel, TP. Modifications of cellular responses to lysophosphatidic acid (LPA) and platelet activating factor (PAF) by plasma gelsolin (pGSN). 2006. Am J Physiol Cell Physiology, 292: C1323-C1330.

140. Weins, A, Schlondorff, Nakamura, F, Denker, BM, Hartwig, JH, Stossel, TP, Pollak, MR. A disease-associated mutant α-actinin-4 reveals a novel mechanism for regulating its F-actin binding affinity. 2007. PNAS, 104: 16080–16085.

141. Nakamura, F, Osborn, TM, Hartemink,CA, Hartwig, JH, Stossel, TP. Structural basis of filamin A functions. 2007. J Cell Bol, 179: 1011–1025.

142. Lee, P-S, Patel, S, Christiani, DC, Bajwa, E, Stossel, TP, Waxman, AB. Plasma gelsolin depletion and circulating actin in sepsis – a pilot study. 2008. PLoS one, 3: e3712.

143. Osborne, TM, Verdrengh, M, Stossel, TP, Tarkowski, A, Bokarewa, M. Decreased levels of the gelsolin plasma isoform in patients with rheumatoid arthritis. 2008. Arthritis Res Ther. 10: R117.

144. Lee, PS. Sampath, K, Karumanchi, S, Tamez, H, Bhan I., Isakova T., Gutierrez, O. Wolf, M, Chang, Y, Stossel, T, Thadhani, R. 2009. Plasma gelsolin, circulating actin, and chronic hemodialysis mortality. J Am Soc Nephrol 20: 1140–1148.

145. Nakamura, F, Heikkinen, O, Pentikäinen, OT, Osborn, TM, Kasza, KE, Weitz, DA, Kupainen, O, Permi, P, Kilpäinen, I, Ylänne, J, Hartwig, JH, Stossel, TP. Molecular basis of filamin A-FilGAP interaction and its impairment in congenital disorders associated with filamin A mutations. 2009. PLoS ONE 4: e4928

146. Kasza, KE, Koenderink, GH, Lin YC, Broedersz, CP, Messner, W, Nakamura, F, Stossel, TP, MacKintosh, FC, Weitz, DA. Nonlinear elasticity of stiff biopolymers connected by flexible linkers. 2009. Phys Rev Lett E, 79: 041928-1-5. Reprinted in Vir J Biol Phys Res 17 (9) 2009

147. Kasza KE, Nakamura F, Hu S, Kollmannsberger P, Bonakdar N, Fabry B, Stossel, TP, Weitz, DA. Filamin A is essential for active cell stiffening but not passive stiffening under external force. Biophys J 2009; 96: 4326–4335.

148. Koenderink, GH, Dogic, Z, Nakamura, F, Bendix, PM, Mackintosh, FC, Hartwig, JH, Stossel, TP, Weitz, DA. An active biopolymer network controlled by molecular motors. 2009. PNAS, 106: 15192–15197.

149. Playford, M, Nurminen, E, Pentikainen, OT, Milgram, S, Hartwig, JH, Stossel, TP, Nakamura, F .The cystic fibrosis transmembrane conductance regulator interacts with multiple Ig domains of filamin A. J Biol Chem 2010; 285: 17156–17165.

150. Kasza, KE, Broedersz, CP, Koenderink, GH, Lin, YC, Messner, W, Millman, EA, Nakamura, F, Stossel, TP, MacKintosh, FC, Weitz, DA. Actin filament length tunes elasticity of flexibly crosslinked actin networks. 2010. Biophys J. 2010; 99: 1091–1100.

151. Ehrlicher, AJ, Nakamura, F, Hartwig, JH, Weitz, DA, Stossel, TP. Mechanical strain in actin networks regulates FilGAP and integrin binding to filamin A. Nature. 2011; 478: 260-263
 
152. Chen, H, Chandrasekar, S, Sheetz, MP, Stossel, TP, Nakamura, F, Yan, J. Mechanical perturbation of filamin A immunoglobulin repeats 20-21 reveals potential non-equilibrium mechanochemical partner binding function. Sci Rep. 2013; 3:1642. doi:10.1038/srep01642.

153. Nakamura, F, Song, M, Hartwig, JH, Stossel, TP. Documentation and localization of force-mediated filamin A domain perturbations in moving cells. Nature Communic. 2014;14: 4656.

154.Gomez-Mouton C, Fischer T, Peregil RM, Jimenez-Baranda S, Stossel TP, Nakamura F, Manes S. Filamin A interaction with the CXCR4 third intracellular loop regulates endocytosis and signaling of WT and WHIM-like receptors. Blood. 2015;125:1116-25

155. Kumar, AA, Chunda-Liyoka, C, Hennek, JW, Mantina, H, Ryan Lee, SY, Patton, MR, Sambo, P, Sinyangwe, S, Kankasa, C, Chintu, C, Brugnara, C, Stossel, TP, Whitesides, GM. Evaluation of a density-based rapid diagnostic test for sickle cell disease in a clinical setting in Zambia. PLoS One. 2014, DOI:10.1371/journal.pone.0114540

156. Kumar, AA, Hennek, JW, Smith, BS, Kumar, S, Beattie, P, Jain, S, Rolland, JP, Stossel, TP, Chunda-Lioka, C, Whitesides, GM. From the bench to the field in low-cost diagnostics: two case studies. Angew Chem Int Ed Engl. 2015. 54: 5836–5853.

157. Yang, Z, Chiou, T, Stossel, T, Kobzik, L. Plasma Gelsolin Improves Lung Host Defense against Pneumonia by Enhancing Macrophage NOS3 Function. Am J Physiol – Lung Cell Molec Physiol. 2015, 309. L1-L11.

158. Li-Chun, H, Schob, S, Zeller, MS, Pulli, B, Ali, M, Wang, C, Chiou, TT, Tsang, YM, Lee, PS, Stossel, TP, Chen, JW. Gelsolin decreases actin toxicity and inflammation in murine multiple sclerosis. J Neuroimmunol. 2015. 287: 36–42.

159. Song, M, He, Q, Berk, A, Hartwig, JH, Stossel, TP, Nakamura, F. An adventitious interaction of filamin A with RhoGDI2(Tyr153Glu). Biochem Biophys Res Commun. 2016,469: 659–664.

160. Nakdarni, NA, Rajakumar, A, Mokhashi, N, Burke, SD, Rana, S, Salahuddin, S, Dang, Q, Thadhani, R, Krishnan, R, S, Stossel, TP, Karumanchi, SA. Gelsolin is an endogenous inhibitor of syncytiotrophoblast shedding in pregnancy. Pregnancy Hypertens. 2016 6: 333–339.

Invited Reviews, Chapters, Editorials:

1. Root RK, Stossel TP. Functional comparison of Chediak-Higashi syndrome and chronic granulomatous disease leukocytes. Birth defects; original article series. 1972; 8:99-104.

2. Stossel TP. Phagocytosis: The department of defense (editorial). N Engl J Med. 1972; 286:776.
 
3. Stossel TP, Cohn ZA. Phagocytosis and clearance. In: Williams CA, Chase MW, eds. Methods in Immunology and Immunochemistry. New York: Academic Press. 1976; 5:261-301.

4. Stossel TP, Hartwig JH. Phagosomes in macrophages: formation and structure. In: van Furth R, ed. Mononuclear Phagocytes in Immunity, Infection and Pathology. Oxford: Blackwell Scientific. 1975:533-44.

5. Stossel TP. Phagocytosis. N Engl J Med. 1974; 290:717-723, 774–780, 833–839. (A Current Contents "citation classic")

6. Alper CA, Stossel TP, Rosen FS. Genetic defects affecting complement and host resistance to infection. In: Dayton DH, Bellanti JA, eds. The Phagocytic Cell in Host Resistance. New York: Raven Press, 1975:127-41.

7. Stossel TP. Phagocytosis: recognition and ingestion. Semin Hematol. 1975; 12:83-116.

8. Stossel TP. Biology of the polymorphonuclear leukocyte – a review. In: Suskind RM, ed. Host Defenses in Malnutrition and the Immune Response. New York: Raven Press, 1977: 209–23.

9. Stossel TP. Functions of granulocytes. In: Williams WJ, Beutler E, Erslev AJ, Rundles RW, eds. Hematology. New York: McGraw-Hill, 1977:685-98. Revised 1983.

10. Stossel TP, Boxer LA. Qualitative abnormalities of granulocytes. In: Williams WJ, Beutler E, Erslev AJ, Rundles RW, eds. Hematology. New York: McGraw-Hill, 1977:756-69. Revised 1983.

11. Stossel TP, Taylor M. Phagocytosis. In: Rose NR, Friedman H, eds. Manual of Clinical Immunology. Washington DC: American Society for Microbiology Publications, 1976:148-54.

12. Stossel TP, Hartwig JH. Phagocytosis and the contractile proteins of pulmonary macrophages. In: Goldman R, Pollard T, Rosenbaum J, eds. Cell Motility. Cold Spring Harbor Conferences on Cell Proliferation, 1976; 3:529-544.

13. Stossel TP. Disorders of phagocytic effector cells. In: Cohen S, McCluskey RT, Ward PA, eds. Mechanisms of immunopathology. New York: John Wiley & Sons, 1979: 271–88.

14. Cox JM, Stossel TP. Measurement of phagocytosis by macrophages. In: Bloom BR, David JR, eds. In vitro methods in cell-mediated and tumor immunity. New York: Academic Press, 1976: 363–68.

15. Stossel TP. The mechanism of phagocytosis. J Reticuloendothelial Soc. 1976; 19:237-245.

16. Stossel TP. Therapy of neutropenia. In: Conn HF, ed. Current Therapy. Philadelphia: W.B. Saunders, 1977: 273–76.
 
17. Stossel TP. Contractile proteins in phagocytosis. An example of cell surface-to- cytoplasm communication. Fed Proc. 1977; 36: 2181–2184.

18. Stossel TP. Motile functions of phagocytic effector cells. In: Cooper MD, Dayton DH, eds. Development of Host Defenses. New York: Raven Press, 1977: 187–96.

19. Stossel TP. Phagocytosis. In: Greenwalt TJ, Jamieson GA, eds. The Granulocyte: Function and Clinical Utilization. New York: Alan R. Liss, 1977; 13: 87–102.

20. Stossel TP, Hartwig JH, Boxer LA. Contractile proteins and the mechanism of phagocytosis. In: Perry SV, Margreth A, Adelstein RS, eds. Contractile Systems in Non-muscle Tissues. Amsterdam: Elsevier/North Holland, 1976: 323–29.

21. Stossel TP. Neutrophil function tests and neutrophil transfusion. Exp Hemat. 1977; 5:9-14.

22. Stossel TP. Phagocytosis: clinical disorders of recognition and ingestion. Am J Path. 1977; 88:741-751.

23. Stossel TP, Cohen JH. Neutrophil function: normal and abnormal. In: Gordon AS, Silber R, LoBue J, eds. The Year in Hematology. New York: Plenum Medical Press, 1977:192-220.

24. Stossel TP. Leukocytes II. Phagocytosis and its disorders. In: Beck WS, ed. Hematology. Cambridge, MA: MIT Press, 1977:361-373.

25. Stossel TP. Endocytosis. In: Cuatrecasas P, Greaves MF, eds. Receptors and Recognition. London: Chapman & Hall, 1977:105-41.

26. Stossel TP. The mechanism of leukocyte locomotion. In: Gallin JL, Quie PG, eds. Leukocyte Chemotaxis. New York: Raven Press, 1978:143-57.

27. Stossel TP. Contractile proteins in cell structure and function. Ann Rev Med. 1978; 29:427-57.

28. Stossel TP. Principles of infection. In: Strauss RB, ed. Sports Medicine, and
Physiology. Philadelphia: W.B. Saunders, 1979:166-75.

29. Stossel TP. How do phagocytes eat? Ann Inter Med. 1978; 89:398-402.

30. Stossel TP. The phagocyte system. In: Hematology of Infancy and Childhood. Nathan DG, Oski FH, eds. Philadelphia: W. B. Saunders. 1981;2:800-823;

31. Hartwig JH, Yin HL, Stossel TP. Contractile protein and the mechanism of phagocytosis in macrophages. In: van Furth R, ed. Mononuclear Phagocytes. The Hague: Martinus Nijhoff, Publisher, 1980:971-996.

32. Stossel TP, Hartwig JH, Yin HL, Davies WA. Actin-binding protein. In: Cell Motility: Molecules and Organization. Hatano S, Ishikawa H, Sato H, eds. Tokyo: University of Tokyo Press, 1979:189-209.
 
33. Stossel TP. Congenital and acquired disorders of neutrophils. Journal Suisse de Médicine. 1978; l08:1522-1524.

34. Stossel TP. Are all cells muscle in disguise? The Sciences. 1978; 18:14-17.

35. Stossel TP, Bretscher MS, Cecarelli B, Dales S, Helenius A, Heuser JE, Hubbard AL, Kartenbeck J, Kinne R, Papahadjopoulos D, Pearse B, Plattner H, Pollard TD, Reutter W, Satir BH, Schliwa M, Schneider Y-J, Silverstein SC, Weber K. Membrane dynamics. In: Silverstein SC, ed. Transport of Macromolecules in Biological Systems. Berlin: Dahlem Konferenzen, 1978:503-16.

36. Stossel TP, Hartwig JH, Yin HL, Stendahl OI. The motor of amoeboid leukocytes. In: Subtelney NK, Wessels NK, eds. Proceedings of the 38th symposium of the society of developmental biology. New York: Academic Press, 1980:3-21.

37. Stossel TP. Neutrophil phagocytosis. In: Berkman EM, ed. Granulocyte
Physiology Function and Dysfunction. Washington D.C.: American Association of Blood Banks, 1979:49-61.

38. Stossel TP. The motor of ameboid leukocytes. Biochem Soc Symp. 1980; 45:51-63.

39. Becker EL, Stossel TP. Chemotaxis. Fed Proc. 1980; 39:2949-2952.

40. Stossel TP. Actin gelation and the structure and movement of cortical cytoplasm. Cell Surface Reviews. In: Cytoskeletal Elements and Plasma Membrane Organization, Poste G, Nicolson GL, eds, Elsevier, Amsterdam, 1981; 140–168.

41. Stossel TP. Function of the cortical actin lattice in the motor of macrophages. In: Bailey GW, ed. Proceedings 38th meeting of the electron microscopy society of America. Baton Rouge, La.: Claitors Publishing Division, 1980:589-598.

42. Stossel TP, Hartwig JH, Yin HL, Zaner KS, Stendahl OI. Actin gelation and the structure of cortical cytoplasm. Cold Spring Harbor Symp Quant Biol. 1981; 46:569-578.

43. Stossel TP, Hartwig JH, Yin HL. The Motor of Macrophages. In: Denney CB, Kaplan J, eds. Fundamental Mechanisms in Human Cancer Immunology. New York: Academic Press. 1981:259-273.

44. Stossel TP. Immune-mediated neutrophil destruction. In: Bell CA, editor. A Seminar on Immune-mediated Cell Destruction. American Association of Blood Banks. 1981:199-208.

45. Stossel TP. Actin filaments and secretion -the macrophage model. Meth Achiev Cell Biol. 1981; 23:215-230.

46. Hartwig JH, Stossel TP. Macrophage actin-binding protein. In: Frederiksen DW, Cunningham LW, eds. The contractile apparatus for cytoskeleton. Methods in Enzymology 85B. Academic Press, New York, 1982, pp. 480–488.
 
47. Stossel TP. Immunodeficiency caused by phagocyte disorders. In: Seligmann M, Hitzig WH, eds. Primary Immunodeficiencies, INSERM Symposium 16. Elsevier/North- Holland Biomedical Press. 1982; 190:315-327.

48. Hartwig JH, Stossel TP. Macrophages – their use in elucidation of cytoskeletal roles of actin. In: Wilson L, editor. Methods in Cell Biology, 23, Part B, "The cytoskeleton." New York: Academic Press. 1982:201-225.

49. Yin HL, Stossel TP. Calcium control of actin network structure by gelsolin. In: Calcium and Cell Function. Volume 2. Academic Press, New York. 1982:325-337.

50. Stossel TP. Summary: 25th Aspen Lung Conference. Chest. 1983; 83:100S-103S.

51. Yin HL, Stossel TP. The Mechanism of Phagocytosis. In: Karnovsky ML, Bolis L, eds. Phagocytosis – Past and Future. Metchnikoff Centenniel Symposium. Academic Press, New York. 1982:13-27.

52. Stossel TP. The structure of cortical cytoplasm. Phil Trans R Soc Lond B. 1982; 299:275-289.

53. Lind S, Stossel TP. The microfilament network of the platelet. Progress in Hemostasis and Thrombosis. 1982; 6:63-84.

54. Southwick FS, Stossel TP. Contractile proteins in leukocyte functions. Semin
Hematol. 1983; 20:305-321.

55. Stossel TP, Hartwig JH, Southwick FS, Yin HL, Zaner KS. The motor of leukocytes. Fed Proc. 1984; 43:2760-2763.

56. Stossel TP. Contribution of actin to the cytoplasmic matrix. J. Cell Biol. 1984; 99:15s-21s.

57. Stossel TP (editor). Perspectives in Clinical Investigation. Rockefeller University
Press, New York, 1985.

58. Stossel TP, Chaponnier C, Ezzell RM, Hartwig JH, Janmey PA, Kwiatkowski DJ,
Lind SE, Smith DB, Southwick FS, Yin HL, Zaner KS. Nonmuscle actin-binding proteins. Ann Rev Cell Biol. 1985;1:353-402.

59. Stossel TP. Oil-droplet method for measuring phagocytosis. Meth Enzymol. 1986; 132:192-198.

60. Stossel TP. The Molecular Biology of Phagocytes and of Nonneoplastic Phagocyte Disorders. In: The Molecular Basis Of Blood Disorders, G Stamatoyannopoulos, AW Nienhuis, P Leder, PW Majerus, eds. WB Saunders, 1987, 499–533.

61. Stossel TP, Janmey PA, Zaner KS. The cortical cytoplasmic actin gel. In: Cytomechanics. J Bereiter- Hahn, OR Anderson and WE Reif, eds. Berlin: Springer-Verlag. 1987; pp. 131–153.
 
62. Stossel TP, Hartwig JH, Janmey PA, Yin HL, Zaner KS. The motor of leukocytes and platelets. In: The Molecular Biology of the Arterial Wall. G. Schettler, ed., Springer-Verlag. 1987; pp. 86–87.

63. Stossel TP. Mechanical responses of white blood cells. In: Inflammation. Basic Mechanism and Clinical Correlates. J. Gallin, I. Goldstein, R. Snyderman, eds. Raven Press. 1988; pp. 325–342. Second Edition, 1992, pp 459–475, Third Edition,1999, pp 661–680.

64. Stossel TP. From signal to pseudopod: how cells control cytoplasmic actin assembly. J Biol Chem. 1989; 264:18261-18264.

65. Stossel TP. Actin-Membrane interactions in eukaryotic mammalian cells. In: Current Topics in Membranes and Transport. 1990; 36:97-107.

66. Stossel TP. How cells crawl. American Scientist. 1990; 78:408-423.

67. Stossel TP. Molecular basis of white blood cell motility. In: The Molecular Basis Of Blood Disorders, G Stamatoyannopoulos, AW Nienhuis, PW Majerus, A Varmus, eds. WB Saunders, Second Edition. 1994, pp 541–562.

68. Stossel, TP. The machinery of cell crawling. Sci Am. 1994; 271: 54–63.

69. Stossel, TP. The machinery of cell movements. The 1993 E. Donnall Thomas Lecture. Blood. 1994; 84: 367–379.

70. Stossel, TP, Hartwig, JH, Janmey, PA, Kwiatkowski, DJ. Cell crawling 20 years after Abercrombie, In, Cell Behavior: Control and Mechanism of Motility, JM Lackie, GA Dunn, GE Jones, Eds. 1999; Portland Press, London, pp 267–280.

71. Janmey, PA, Stossel, TP, Allen, PG. Deconstructing gelsolin: identifying sites that mimic or alter binding to actin and phosphoinositides. Chem & Biol. 1998; 5: R81-R85.

72. Stossel, TP. The early history of phagocytosis. In: Adv Cell and Molecular Biology of Membranes and Organelles. AM Tartakoff, Series Editor; S Gordon, Volume Editor. 1999; JAI Press. 5: 3–18.

73. Goetzl, EJ, Lee,H, Dolezalova, H, Kalli, KR, Conover, CA, Hu, Y-L, Azuma, T, Stossel, TP, Karliner, JS, Jaffe, RB. Mechanisms of lysolipid phosphate effects on cellular survival and proliferation. Ann NY Acad Sci 2000; 905: 177–187.

74. Janmey, PA, Shah, JV, Tang, JX, Stossel, TP. Actin filament networks. Results, Probl Cell Differ 2001; 32: 181–199.

75. Stossel, TP. Manifesto for a cytoplasmic revolution (Book Review). Science 2001; 293: 611, 2001.

76. Stossel, TP, Hartwig, JH. Filling gaps in signaling to actin cytoskeleton. Dev Cell, 2003, 4: 444–445.

77. Stossel, TP, Fenteany G, Hartwig, JH. Cell surface actin remodeling at a glance. J Cell Sci, 2006; 119: 3261–3264.

78. Stossel, TP. The discovery of statins. Cell. 2008; 134: 903–905.

79. Stossel, TP. Filamins and the potential of complexity. Cell Cycle. 2010; 9: 1463.

80. Nakamura, F, Stossel, TP, Hartwig, JH. The filamins. Organizers of cell structure and function. Cell Adhesion & Migration. 2011; 5: 1–10.

81. Stossel, TP. Introduction to medical innovation. In, Medical Innovation. Concept to Commercialization. Behrns, KE, Gingles, B, Starr, MG, Editors. Academic Press, Elsevier, 2018. 1–8.

Books:

1. Babior BM, Stossel TP. Hematology. A Pathophysiological Approach. Churchill-Livingstone, 1984. Second edition, 1989. Third edition, 1994.

2. Handin, RI, Lux, SE., Stossel, TP, Editors. Blood. Principles and Practice of Hematology. (92 Contributors, 2305 pp.) Lipincott Publishing Co. 1995. Second edition (119 contributors, 2304 pp.) 2003.

3. Stossel, TP. Pharmaphobia: How the Conflict of Intererest Mania is undermining America's Medical Innovation. Rowman & Littlefield Publishers, Inc. 2015.

Issued Patents:

1. Stossel, TP, Janmey, PA, Lind, SL Therapeutic uses of actin-binding molecules. US Patent Number 102,713, August 6, 1993, Div. of Number 774, 738, issued October 10, 1991, Continuation, Number 5,508,265, issued April 16, 1996.

2. Stossel, TP, Hartwig, JH, Janmey, PA. Storage of platelets in the cold. US Patent Number 5,358,844, issued October 25, 1994. European patent Number 684762, issued August 10, 1998.

3. Stossel, TP, Janmey, PA, Lind, SL. Method for reducing the viscosity of pathological mucoid airway contents in the respiratory tract comprising administering actin-bindingcompounds with or without DNAse. US Patent Number, 5,464,817, issued November 7, 1995 and Number 5,656,589, issued August 12, 1997 (Also issued in Australia with applications pending in Canada, China, Europe, Great Britain, Japan, South Korea, Norway, New Zealand and Singapore).

4. Janmey, PA, Lind, SL, Stossel, TP. Effects of actin filaments of fibrin clot structure and lysis. US Patent Number 5,691,160, issued November 25, 1997.

5. Janmey, PA, Cunningham, CC, Hartwig, JH, Stossel, TP. Polyphosphoinositide binding peptides for intracellular drug delivery. US Patent Number 5,783,662, issued July 21, 1998; US Patent Number 5,846,743, issued December 8, 1998.

6. Stossel, TP, Hartwig, JH, Janmey, PA. Preservation of Blood Platelets. US Patent Number 5,876,676, issued March 2, 1999.

7. Stossel, TP, Hartwig, JH, Hoffmeister, KM, Clausen, H. Composition and Methods for Prolonging Survival of Platelets. US Patent Number 7241282, issued July 10, 2007.

8. Stossel, TP, Hartwig, JH, Hoffmeister, KM, Clausen, H. Methods for prolonging survival of platelets using UDP galactose. US Patent Number 7858295, issued December 28, 2010.

9. Rosiello, IM, Clausen, H, Wandall, H, Stossel, TP, Hartwig, JH, Hoffmeister, KM. Prolonging survival of platelets using CMP-sialic, UDPgalactose or both. US Patent Number 8221745, issued July 1, 2012.

10. Stossel, TP, Lee, P-S, Dittle, B, Katarzyna, M. Use of gelsolin to treat multiple sclerosis and to diagnose neurologic diseases. US Patent Number 8,440,622 B2, issued May 14, 2013. Canadian Patent Number 2680333, issued October 25, 2016. Japanese Divisional Patent 2011-271607 issued September 2, 2017. European Patent Number 07753226.5 issued September 27, 2017. Japaneses Patent Number 6203995 issued September 8, 2017.

11. Thadhani, R, Stossel, TP, Lee, PS, Karumanchi, A. Diagnostic and therapeutic uses of gelsolin in renal failure. European Patent Number 13186249.2-1404, issued November 19, 2013. European Patent Number 2250280 issued December 3, 2014. European Patent Number 2708603, issued April 19, 2017. Japanese Patent Number 2010-544349 issued June 23, 2015. Japanese Patent Number 5778425 issued July 17, 2015 (Divisional 1015-5994 grant of issuance October 17, 2016). US Patent Number 12/358,868 issued February 21, 2017. European Patent Number 2002258 Issued September 27, 2017.

12. Stossel, TP, Lee, P-S. Use of gelsolin to treat infections. Canadian Patent Number 2607686, November 4, 2014,

13. Stossel, TP, Osborn, TACM, Tarkowski, A, Leuchovius, E. Use of gelsolin to diagnose and treat inflammatory diseases. US Patent Number 9,316,639 B2 issued April
19, 2016; Korean Patent Number 10-1556790, issued September 23, 2015; European Patent number 2001496, issued July 27, 2017; Japanese Patent Number 2015-137491, granted July, 2017. Japanese Patent Number 6198777.

14. Whitesides, GA, Kumar, AA, Hennek, JW, Lim, C, Moreno, Y, Mace, CR, Duralsingh, MT, Patton, MR, Lee, S-y, Stossel, TP. Multiple systems for diagnosis of sickle cell disease. US Patent Number 9,678,088 B2, issued June 13, 2017.

References

1941 births
2019 deaths
American hematologists
American medical researchers
American medical writers
American people of German-Jewish descent
Harvard Medical School alumni
Harvard Medical School staff
Jewish American writers
Jewish physicians
Members of the National Academy of Medicine
Presidents of the American Society of Hematology
Princeton University alumni